David Linsay Willetts, Baron Willetts,  (born 9 March 1956) is a British politician and life peer. From 1992 to 2015, he was the Member of Parliament (MP) representing the constituency of Havant in Hampshire. He served as Minister of State for Universities and Science from 2010 until July 2014 and became a member of the House of Lords in 2015. He was appointed chair of the UK Space Agency's board in April 2022. He is also President of the Resolution Foundation – a living standards-focused think-tank.

Education

Willetts was educated at King Edward's School, Birmingham, and Christ Church, Oxford, where he studied Philosophy, politics and economics. Willetts graduated with a first-class degree.

Policy researcher
Having served as Nigel Lawson's private researcher, Willetts took charge of the Treasury monetary policy division at 26 before moving over to Margaret Thatcher's Policy Unit at 28. Aged 31, he subsequently took over the Centre for Policy Studies.

Paul Foot wrote in Private Eye that in a 1993 document called The Opportunities for Private Funding in the NHS, published by the Social Market Foundation and financed by private healthcare company BUPA, Willetts provided the "intellectual thrust" for private finance initiatives (PFIs) in the National Health Service.

First period in government

Aged 36, Willetts entered Parliament in 1992 as the MP for Havant. He quickly established himself in Parliament, becoming a Whip, a Cabinet Office Minister, and then Paymaster General in his first term (when that role was split between the Cabinet Office and HM Treasury as a policy co-ordination role). During this period Willetts gained "Two Brains" as a nickname, a monicker reportedly coined by The Guardian's former political editor Michael White. However, Willetts was forced to resign from the latter post by the Standards and Privileges Committee over an investigation into Neil Hamilton in 1996, when it found that he had "dissembled" in his evidence to the Committee over whether pressure was put onto an earlier investigation into Hamilton.

Shadow Cabinet
Despite the resignation, Willetts was able to return to the shadow front bench a few years later while William Hague was Leader of the Opposition, initially serving in the Shadow Cabinet as Shadow Education Secretary before becoming Shadow Social Security (later Shadow Work and Pensions) Secretary.  He carved out a reputation as an expert on pensions and benefits. Since leaving the DWP post, he has been recruited as an external consultant by the actuaries Punter Southall.

Following the 2005 election, he served as  Shadow Secretary of State for Trade and Industry in the Shadow Cabinet under Michael Howard. In August 2005, after ruling out running for leader owing to a lack of support, commentators speculated that he was gunning for the post of Shadow Chancellor of the Exchequer and would cut a deal with either David Davis or David Cameron. On 15 September he confirmed his support for Davis, at that time the bookies' favourite. Willetts, a centrist moderniser, went to ground following the announcement of the Davis tax plan since it was widely speculated that he disagreed with the seemingly uncosted and widely derided tax plan and found it impossible to defend. Davis then lost the candidacy race to Cameron.

Following Cameron's win, Willetts was appointed Shadow Secretary of State for Education and Skills in Cameron's first Shadow Cabinet in December 2005, the role Cameron had vacated, and later becoming Shadow Secretary of State for Innovation, Universities and Skills. His title became Shadow Minister for Universities and Skills since Gordon Brown's merger of the Department for Innovation, Universities and Skills with the Department for Business, Enterprise and Regulatory Reform into the Department for Business, Innovation and Skills in June 2009.

On 19 May 2007, Willetts made a controversial speech on grammar schools in which he defended the existing Conservative Party policy of not reintroducing grammar schools. The speech received a mixed reception. The analysis was applauded by The Guardian and The Times. However, the more right-wing The Daily Telegraph was strongly critical of the speech, which was unpopular with some Conservative Party activists. The speech was made more controversial when David Cameron weighed into the argument, backing Willetts' speech and describing his critics as "delusional", accusing them of "splashing around in the shallow end of the educational debate" and of "clinging on to outdated mantras that bear no relation to the reality of life".

The Department for Education and Skills was abolished by the new Prime Minister, Gordon Brown, who established two new departments. On 2 July 2007, Cameron reshuffled Willetts down to the junior of the two departments: the Department for Innovation, Universities and Skills.

Second period in government
Following the 2010 general election, Prime Minister David Cameron appointed Willetts as the Minister of State for Universities and Science.

Feminism claim
In June 2011, Willetts said during the launch of the Government's social mobility strategy that movement between the classes had "stagnated" over the past 40 years, and Willetts attributed this partly to the entry of women into the workplace and universities for the lack of progress for men. "Feminism trumped egalitarianism", he said, adding that women who would otherwise have been housewives had taken university places and well-paid jobs that could have gone to ambitious working-class men. He went on to say that, "One of the things that happened over that period was that the entirely admirable transformation of opportunities for women meant that with a lot of the expansion of education in the 1960s, '70s and '80s, the first beneficiaries were the daughters of middle-class families who had previously been excluded from educational opportunities [...] And if you put that with what is called 'assortative mating' – that well-educated women marry well-educated men – this transformation of opportunities for women ended up magnifying social divides. It is delicate territory because it is not a bad thing that women had these opportunities, but it widened the gap in household incomes because you suddenly had two-earner couples, both of whom were well-educated, compared with often workless households where nobody was educated".

Tuition fees and student loan debts
As the minister responsible for universities, Willetts was an advocate and spokesperson for the coalition government's policy of increasing the cap on tuition fees in England and Wales from £3,225 to £9,000 per year.

In November 2013, Willetts announced the sale of student loans to Erudio Student Loans – a debt collection consortium – removing £160m from public debt but ignoring the implications for former students.

Peerage and further ventures
In July 2014, Willetts announced that he would not contest the next general election, saying that "after more than 20 years the time has come to move onto fresh challenges." In October 2014, Willetts was appointed a visiting professor at King's College London. It was announced that he was to be a life peer in the 2015 Dissolution Honours and was created Baron Willetts, of Havant in the County of Hampshire, on 16 October 2015. In June 2015, Willetts was appointed executive chair of the think tank the Resolution Foundation. In May 2018 he was elected a Honorary Fellow of the Royal Society. In February 2022 he was appointed a director of the Synbioven investment fund, and in April 2022 he was appointed chair of the board of the UK Space Agency.

Brexit
Willetts is one of the signatories of a statement by senior Conservatives calling for a second referendum over Brexit. This states, "If we are to remain a party of government, it is absolutely critical that we increase our support among younger generations.  To do this, we must listen to and engage with their concerns on Brexit. They voted overwhelmingly to Remain in the European Union in 2016 – and since then have become even stronger in their views. Since the referendum, nearly 2 million young people are now of voting age. Of those in this group who are certain to vote, an astounding 87% support the United Kingdom staying in the European Union. If we do not hear their voices, who could blame them for feeling excluded and powerless on this most vital issue. The truth is that if Brexit fails this generation, we risk losing young people for good. Our party's electoral future will be irrevocably blighted." In early 2019, he co-founded the group Right to Vote.

Free votes record
According to the Public Whip analyses, Willetts was strongly in favour of an elected House of Lords and was strongly against the ban on fox hunting. TheyWorkForYou additionally records that, amongst other things, Willetts was strongly in favour of the Iraq War, strongly in favour of an investigation into it, moderately against equal gay rights, and very strongly for replacing Trident.

Other interests
Following his decision to stand down at the 2015 General Election, Willetts joined the Resolution Foundation in Summer 2015. He Chaired the Foundation's Intergenerational Commission between 2016 and 2018, and is now President of the Resolution Foundation, along with its Intergenerational Centre. He is currently a visiting professor at King's College London where he works with the Policy Institute at King's, a visiting professor at the Cass Business School, a board member of the Institute for Fiscal Studies and a visiting fellow at Nuffield College, Oxford. On 9 February 2018, the University of Leicester announced they had elected David Willetts as successor to Bruce Grocott to become their new chancellor.

Willetts is the author of several books on conservatism, including "Why Vote Conservative" (1996) and "Modern Conservatism" (1992), as well as numerous articles. He was a founding signatory in 2005 of the Henry Jackson Society principles, advocating a proactive approach to the spread of liberal democracy across the world, including when necessary by military intervention. He is an honorary member of Conservative Friends of Poland.

Civic conservatism
Willetts has pioneered the idea of "civic conservatism" [D. Willetts, "Civic Conservatism", SMF (1994)]. This is the idea of focusing on the institutions between the state and individuals as a policy concern (rather than merely thinking of individuals and the state as the only agencies) and is one of the principles behind the increasing support in the Conservative Party's localist agenda and its emphasis on voluntary organisations.  During an interview with The Spectator, he was referred to as 'the real father of Cameronism'.

Fourteen years after the publication of "Civic Conservatism" Willetts gave the inaugural Oakeshott Memorial Lecture to the London School of Economics in which he made an attempt to explain how game theory can be used to help think about how to improve social capital.  The lecture was described by the Times as "an audacious attempt by the Conservative Party's leading intellectual to relate a new Tory narrative".

Civic conservatism, like free market economics, proceeds from deep-seated individual self-interest towards a stable cooperation. It sets the Tories the task not of changing humanity but of designing institutions and arrangements that encourage our natural reciprocal altruism.

Personal life and member's interests
Willetts is married to the artist Sarah Butterfield. The couple have one daughter, born 1988, and one son, born 1992. His wealth in 2009 was estimated at £1.9m, and his declarations for the Register of Members' Financial Interests may be viewed here.

Honours
 He was sworn in as a member of the Privy Council of the United Kingdom in 2010, giving him the honorific title "The Right Honourable" and after ennoblement the post nominal letters "PC" for life.
 He was awarded a life peerage in 2015, allowing him to sit in the House of Lords. He took the title Baron Willetts, of Havant in the County of Hampshire. He sits with the Conservative Party benches.

Scholastic
 University degrees

 Chancellor, visitor, governor, and fellowships

Honorary degrees

Memberships and fellowships

Published works

References

For Willetts' roles in the 1980s–1990s as a welfare specialist:

External links
 David Willetts MP official constituency website
 Profile at the Conservative Party
 
 Article archive at The Guardian
 The Tories don't have to make a false choice between roots or freedom, David Willetts, The Times, 2 June 2005
 
 
 
 Profile: David Willetts BBC News, 22 October 2002

|-

|-

|-

|-

|-

|-

|-

|-

|-

|-

|-

|-

|-

1956 births
Academics of City, University of London
Academics of Bayes Business School
Alumni of Christ Church, Oxford
Conservative Party (UK) MPs for English constituencies
Conservative Party (UK) life peers
Life peers created by Elizabeth II
Fellows of the Royal Society
Honorary Fellows of the Royal Society
Fellows of the Academy of Social Sciences
Fellows of the Royal Society of Chemistry
Living people
Members of the Privy Council of the United Kingdom
People educated at King Edward's School, Birmingham
Ministers for Universities (United Kingdom)
UK MPs 1992–1997
UK MPs 1997–2001
UK MPs 2001–2005
UK MPs 2005–2010
UK MPs 2010–2015
United Kingdom Paymasters General